Fédération Internationale de Boules (abbreviated FIB) is part of the "Confédération Mondiale des Sports de Boules" which is the highest international authority of bocce sports acknowledged by the International Olympic Committee. The current FIB president is Frédéric Ruis from France.

FIB governs the sport of bocce volo, also known as boule lyonnaise.

FIB has 51 member associations on all continents (except Antarctica).

History
The need for a single body to oversee bocce associations became clear shortly after World War II. The spiritual father of FIB, André Mignot, started negotiations among French, Swiss and Italian bocce associations. FIB was founded in Ville-la-Grand (France) on April 14, 1946, and the first official international competition took place the next year. During the next 60 years the number of associations increased from only four (France, Italy, Monaco and Switzerland) to more than 50.

See also
Association of the IOC Recognised International Sports Federations

References

External links
FIB web site

Boules
Sports organizations established in 1946
IOC-recognised international federations